Art & Australia Pty Ltd is a biannual digital magazine, the country's longest-running art journal, since 1963. Art & Australia (now Art + Australia) relaunched a new digital publishing platform in August 2022.

History 

In May 2013, ARTAND Australia celebrated its fiftieth anniversary. First published by Sam Ure Smith in May 1963, it followed Sam's father Sydney Ure Smith’s publication "Art in Australia", which was in print 1916–42.

From 1963 to 1983, Mervyn Horton was the magazine's founding editor. He was followed by Elwyn Lynn, Jennifer Phipps and Leon Paroissien, Dinah Dysart, Hannah Fink and Laura Murray Cree. In 2003, Eleonora Triguboff became Editor/Publisher of ARTAND Australia, former editors include Laura Murray-Cree, Claire Armstrong, Katrina Schwarz, Michael Fitzgerald and Genevieve O'Callaghan. The magazine has also involved many distinguished editorial advisers.

Since 2004, winners of the ARTAND Australia / Credit Suisse Private Banking Contemporary Art Award – awarded to Australian and New Zealand emerging artists – have appeared on the magazine's back cover. Since 2008, the magazine has partnered to host the Gertrude Contemporary and ARTAND Australia Emerging Writers Program. ARTAND Australia also regularly collaborates with artists and designers to produce Artist Editions and Artist Projects.

In August 2013, the print magazine celebrated fifty years and its 200th issue. The 201st issue – volume 51, number 1 in August 2013 – featured a redesign by Melbourne-based design firm Fabio Ongarato Design.

Art & Australia continues to evolve in the exciting though turbulent world of converging media and art. In 2014 Art & Australia launched a new website as a platform to share their archive of over fifty years and daily news. At this time they decided to migrate to a fully online presence and increase their focus on art book publication with Dott Publishing, an imprint of Art & Australia.

In 2015, Eleonora Triguboff donated Art & Australia to the Victorian College of Arts. Triguboff's ARTAND Foundation retained Dott Publishing. From 2015 Art & Australia has been published as Art + Australia. In the period between 2015-2021 Art + Australia published a biannual, thematic issues that charted the geopolitical conditions of contemporary artistic practice. Alongside the magazine Art + Australia ran an online platform of art criticism and commentary, alongside a book imprint. 

In 2022 Art + Australia shifted to a digital publishing model with biannual publication of the latest discussions, criticism and reflections on contemporary artistic practice from Australia and abroad. This is supplemented by a book imprint and a range of other publishing activities.

Editors

Past 
 Mervyn Horton
 Elwyn Lynn
 Jennifer Phipps and Leon Paroissien
 Dinah Dysart
 Hannah Fink
 Laura Murray Cree
 Claire Armstrong
 Eleonora Triguboff
 Katrina Schwarz
 Michael Fitzgerald

Present 

Editor-in-chief  | Su Baker 
 
Editor | Jeremy Eaton

Editorial Advisers

Past 

 Yuji Abe
 Jenny Åland
 Claire Armstrong
 Leigh Astbury
 Paul Beadle
 Pamela Bell
 Kym Bonython
 John Brack
 Janine Burke
 Rex Butler
 Melvin N. Day
 Geoffrey Dutton
 Dinah Dysart
 Juliana Engberg
 Tom Gibbons
 James Gleeson
 Ted Gott
 Guy Grey-Smith
 Sasha Grishin
 Robert Haines
 Deborah Hart
 Leonard Hessing
 Ursula Hoff
 Richard Hook
 Jeanette Hoorn
 John Hoy
 Jennifer Isaacs
 Hamish Keith
 Franz Kempf
 Brian Ladd
 Suzanne Lord
 Ross Luck
 Jeffrey Makin
 Fred Martin
 Louise Martin-Chew
 Ronald Millen
 Djon Mundine
 K. Okamoto
 John Olsen
 Leon Parossien
 Stephen Rainbird
 Eric Rowlinson
 Andrew Sayers
 Brian Seidel
 Michael Shannon
 Rose Skinner
 Trevor Smith
 Ted Snell
 Henry A. Stroud
 Graeme Sturgeon
 Daniel Thomas
 Laurie Thomas
 Wallace Thornton
 Peter Timms
 Angus Trumble
 Kurt von Meier
 Nick Waterlow
 Chisaburoh F. Yamada

Present 

 Thomas Berghuis
 Tony Bond
 Gregory Burke
 Rex Butler
 Joanna Capon
 Max Delany
 John Denton
 Natalie King
 Paula Latos-Valier
 Victoria Lynn
 Mitchell Oakley Smith
 Fabio Ongarato
 Justin Paton
 Kate Rhodes
 Liane Rossler
 Gene Sherman
 Russell Storer
 Sarah Tutton
 Anna Waldmann

Selected contributors 

 John Armstrong
 Murray Bail
 Tim Bonyhady
 Lily Brett
 Brian Castro
 Nick Cave
 Robyn Davidson
 Luke Davies
 Rosemary Dobson
 Richard Flanagan
 Sia Figiel
 Gwen Harwood
 Robert Hughes
 Siri Hustvedt
 Ivor Indyk
 Linda Jaivin
 Nicholas Jose
 Evelyn Juers
 Alex Miller
 Drusilla Modjeska
 Louis Nowra
 Mandy Sayer
 Barry Schwabsky
 Thomas Shapcott
 Sebastian Smee
 Alexis Wright

Selected cover artists 

 Ian Fairweather
 Margaret Preston
 Sidney Nolan
 Colin McCahon
 Sydney Ball
 Stanislaus Rapotec
 Tony Tuckson
 Robert Rooney
 Russell Drysdale
 Declan Apuatimi
 Tim Leura Tjapaltjarri
 Nora Heysen
 Jenny Watson
 Wendy Sharpe
 Rosalie Gascoigne
 Emily Kame Kngwarreye
 Fiona Hall
 Bill Henson
 Martin Sharp
 Chicks on Speed

Archive 

Past issues of ARTAND Australia are available online in digital format on payment of a subscription.
Subscribers can access more than 200 issues of Australia's definitive art journal, ARTAND Australia, a unique resource for schools, universities and art lovers alike. Fully text searchable, the ARTAND Australia Archive allows you to immerse yourself more than 50 years of art history while keeping up to date with the latest developments in contemporary art.

Projects 

ARTAND Australia actively engages with artmaking through Artist Editions, Artist Projects, Cover Commissions and Education Collaborations. The magazine has work with artists Louise Weaver; Nell; Vanila Netto and fashion designers Romance Was Born; Locust Jones; Patrick Pound; and Juan Davila. Other projects have involved working with organisations such as the Australian Literacy and Numeracy Foundation and The Red Room Company.

ARTAND Australia / Credit Suisse Private Banking Contemporary Art Award 

Established in 2004, the ARTAND Australia / Credit Suisse Private Banking Contemporary Art Award supports artists in the first five years of practice with a critical text and the illustration of their artwork on the magazine's back cover and gatefold. The ARTAND Australia / Credit Suisse Private Banking Contemporary Art Award is administered by the National Association for the Visual Arts and supported by Credit Suisse Private Banking.

Gertrude Contemporary and ARTAND Australia Emerging Writers Program 

The Gertrude Contemporary and ARTAND Australia Emerging Writers Program is a selective mentorship program that developed from a 2005 Gertrude Contemporary, Melbourne, initiative. It pairs four emerging writers with leading arts specialists each year, offering participants the opportunity to develop their writing practice, publish their works and gain further insight into the field of contemporary art writing, featuring their work in the pages of ARTAND Australia and through Gertrude Contemporary's Studio 12 exhibition program.

Books 

Art & Australia Pty Ltd is the publishing house that prints ARTAND Australia, with Dott Publishing the arm that produces contemporary art books and artist collaborative books. These include Current: Contemporary Art from Australia and New Zealand (2008) and the 2012 Del Kathryn Barton and Oscar Wilde book, The Nightingale and the Rose. New titles include "Chinese Zodiac" (2014) that presents a dynamic new series of artworks created by twelve of Australia's leading contemporary artists, with an introduction by Benjamin Law and "Tony Albert" (2015) the first comprehensive survey of the multidisciplinary oeuvre of the artist. Dott Publishing has recently released a collaboration with Hong Kong born Melbourne based artist Kate Beynon, the title "An-Li: A Chinese Ghost Tale" (2015) marks the second iteration of the Dott Tales series, following on from The Nightingale and the Rose.

Art + Australia has published and co-published eight books since 2015.

Notes and references

External links 

 http://www.artandaustralia.com Official website
 https://web.archive.org/web/20150519151849/https://instagram.com/artandaustralia Instagram
 https://www.visualarts.net.au/grants/art-and-australia-award
 http://www.gertrude.org.au/programs/emerging-writers/

1963 establishments in Australia
Biannual magazines published in Australia
Arts magazines published in Australia
Magazines established in 1963
Magazines published in Sydney